Burton is the name of an electoral ward in Pembrokeshire, Wales. The ward consists of the communities, of Burton and Rosemarket. The community of Burton consists of part of Pembrokeshire Coast National Park

A ward of Pembrokeshire County Council since 1995, it was previously a ward of the former Preseli Pembrokeshire District Council.

History
At the first election for the new Pembrokeshire County Council in 1995, an Independent, previously a member of Preseli Pembrokeshire District Council was elected.

At the second election, in 1999 the Conservative Party fielded candidates in Pembrokeshire for the first time and Burton was one of the three seats that were captured. David Wildman narrowly defeated the sitting Independent member.

By the third election, in 2004 Wildman. having been elected as a Conservative in 1999, defeating the sitting Independent councillor, had subsequently joined the Independents himself.

Wildman was returned unopposed in 2008 and  2012.

A by-election was held in the Burton Ward on 11 April 2013 following the retirement of David Wildman. The successful candidate stood as an 'Independent Plus' candidate, supporting the ruling group on the authority.

-->

References

Pembrokeshire electoral wards